Jeffrey Adgate "Jeff" Dean (born July 23, 1968) is an American computer scientist and software engineer. Since 2018, he is the lead of Google AI, Google's AI division.

Education 
Dean received a B.S., summa cum laude, from the University of Minnesota in computer science and economics in 1990. He received a Ph.D. in computer science from the University of Washington in 1996, working under Craig Chambers on compilers and whole-program optimization techniques for object-oriented programming languages. He was elected to the National Academy of Engineering in 2009, which recognized his work on "the science and engineering of large-scale distributed computer systems".

Career 
Before joining Google, Dean worked at DEC/Compaq's Western Research Laboratory, where he worked on profiling tools, microprocessor architecture and information retrieval. Much of his work was completed in close collaboration with Sanjay Ghemawat.

Before graduate school, he worked at the World Health Organization's Global Programme on AIDS, developing software for statistical modeling and forecasting of the HIV/AIDS pandemic.

Dean joined Google in mid-1999, and is currently the head of its Artificial Intelligence division. While at Google, he designed and implemented large portions of the company's advertising, crawling, indexing and query serving systems, along with various pieces of the distributed computing infrastructure that underlies most of Google's products. At various times, he has also worked on improving search quality, statistical machine translation and internal software development tools and has had significant involvement in the engineering hiring process.

The projects Dean has worked on include:
 Spanner, a scalable, multi-version, globally distributed, and synchronously replicated database
 Some of the production system design and statistical machine translation system for Google Translate
 Bigtable, a large-scale semi-structured storage system
 MapReduce, a system for large-scale data processing applications
 LevelDB, an open-source on-disk key-value store
 DistBelief, a proprietary machine-learning system for deep neural networks that was eventually refactored into TensorFlow 
 TensorFlow, an open-source machine-learning software library

He was an early member of Google Brain, a team that studies large-scale artificial neural networks, and he has headed artificial intelligence efforts since they were split from Google Search.

Dean was the subject of controversy when the ethics in AI researcher, Timnit Gebru, challenged Google's research review process, ultimately leading to her departure from the company. Dean responded by publishing a letter on Google's approach to the research process that was the subject of further criticism and controversy.

Philanthropy 
Dean and his wife, Heidi Hopper, started the Hopper-Dean Foundation and began making philanthropic grants in 2011. In 2016, the foundation gave $2 million each to UC Berkeley, Massachusetts Institute of Technology, University of Washington, Stanford University and Carnegie Mellon University to support programs that promote diversity in science, technology, engineering and mathematics (STEM).

Personal life 
Dean is married and has two daughters.

Awards and honors 
 Elected to the National Academy of Engineering (2009)
 Fellow of the Association for Computing Machinery (2009)
 ACM-Infosys Foundation Award (2012)
 ACM SIGOPS Mark Weiser Award (2007)
 Fellow of the American Academy of Arts and Sciences (2016)

Books 
Dean was interviewed for the 2018 book Architects of Intelligence: The Truth About AI from the People Building it by the American futurist Martin Ford.

Major publications 
 Jeffrey Dean and Sanjay Ghemawat. 2004. MapReduce: Simplified Data Processing on Large Clusters. OSDI'04: Sixth Symposium on Operating System Design and Implementation (December 2004)
 Fay Chang, Jeff Dean, Sanjay Ghemawat, Wilson C. Hsieh, Deborah A. Wallach, Mike Burrows, Tushar Chandra, Andrew Fikes, and Robert E. Gruber. 2006. Bigtable: A Distributed Storage System for Structured Data. OSDI'06: 7th Symposium on Operating System Design and Implementation (October 2006)

See also 
 Sanjay Ghemawat
 MapReduce
 TensorFlow

References

External links 
 Jeff Dean's Google home and publication page

Living people
American computer scientists
Artificial intelligence researchers
University of Washington College of Engineering alumni
University of Minnesota College of Science and Engineering alumni
Fellows of the Association for Computing Machinery
Fellows of the American Academy of Arts and Sciences
Members of the United States National Academy of Engineering
Digital Equipment Corporation people
Google employees
Google Fellows
1968 births
Place of birth missing (living people)
Recipients of the ACM Prize in Computing
Open source advocates